Lobosporangium is a fungal genus in the Mortierellaceae family of the Zygomycota. The genus is monotypic, containing the single species Lobosporangium transversale, found in the US and Mexico.

References

Fungi of North America
Monotypic fungi genera
Zygomycota genera